The Imperial Bank of Persia was a British bank that operated as the state bank and bank of issue in Iran (formerly known as Persia until 1935) between 1889 and 1929. It was established in 1885 with a concession from the Persian government to Baron Julius De Reuter (born Israel Beer Josaphat) a German–Jewish banker and businessman who later became a Christian and a British subject.

The bank was the first modern bank in Iran and introduced European banking ideas to a country in which they were previously unknown. The legal centre of the bank was in London and whilst it was subject to British law, its activities were based in Tehran. It also had operations in other Middle Eastern countries. It was later named British Bank of the Middle East (BBME) and is now called HSBC Bank Middle East Limited. After the Iranian Revolution of 1979, all the Iranian activities of this bank were transferred to Bank Tejarat.

Background and history

Nineteenth-century Iran has been described as "one of the most backward countries in the world." As usury was forbidden under Islam, the traditional money lenders in Iran were the Jewish sarrafs, who continued to dominate the field after the Imperial Bank's arrival due to greater loan flexibility and cultural ties. At the time the only form of money in circulation was gold and silver coins.

Reuter was granted the Reuter concession in 1872 which granted him exclusive rights over virtually all the resources in the land of Persia. While the real reason Reuter wanted the concession was in order to develop the railroad in Persia, it also gave him monopoly over banking for sixty years. The concession was hidden from the British government till the last minute, and alarmed both the British and Russian governments upon its revealing. The concession was resented by the local population, which protested that the Shah had granted all the resources of the land to a foreigner and by Russians who saw the British competing with their interest in Persia. Due to mounting pressure, the Shah subsequently cancelled the concession in 1873, citing the fact that Reuter failed to initiate the railway project within 15 months.

Reuter was not to go down without a fight. However it was not until 1889 that he was able to get exclusive banking and mining rights for sixty years. Although this new concession was not as immense as the first one, it still granted him valuable control over Persian banking and mining with the energetic support of British minister, Henry Drummond Wolff.

The Imperial Bank of Persia was finally established in 1889 on the basis of the 1872 concession to Baron Julius De Reuter from the Persian government (Reuter concession) which made it the state bank, with the exclusive right to issue notes and tax free status for sixty years. The Imperial Bank was publicly floated in London.

There was a similar Russian bank known as the Loan and Discount Bank of Persia (Bānk-e Esteqrāżī-e Rūs) which was founded in 1890. The Anglo-Russian Convention of 1907 split Iran into a Russian and British sphere of influence. It assigned to the Russian Loan and Discount Bank the revenues from the amortization of Persian debts in northern Iran, and the same for the British Imperial Bank in southern Iran.

Between 1889 and 1928, the bank operated as the state bank and bank of issue of Iran, and held a virtual monopoly on banking in the country. Sir William Keswick was the bank's chairman. The bank was principally funded by Glyn, Mills & Co., J. Henry Schröder & Co. and David Sassoon & Co. Despite holding a monopoly, the bank's management was farcical, according to Geoffrey Jones, and the bank struggled to make a profit. However, Jones also notes that British banks in this period were allowed to disguise their profits by making transfers to or from "inner" or "secret" reserves before reaching their published profits figure. The Imperial bank's real profits were on average twice as high as the published profits between 1890 and 1952. The bank contributed to the Iranian economy by mobilizing domestic savings, but many were doubtful of the real use of these savings as the Bank often "discriminated against Persians in giving credit". In 1927, 80% of the loans granted in Bushehr, Shiraz and Esfahan were to finance Iranian export of opium, whereas most of the loans in the northern cities related to the trade with Russia. The imperial bank did not employ locals as managers; in contrast, the Imperial Ottoman Bank, which was under mixed British, French and Turkish ownership employed middle eastern nationals in managerial positions. The bank's first owner, Joseph Rabino, born in London to an Italian Jewish family, was always regarded with great suspicion by his board.
He served eighteen years in Persia and was instrumental in building up the bank's reputation. At the time, Persians were wary of giving up silver and gold coins for paper notes. He ordered all branches to keep enough silver coins to be able to redeem paper notes for silver on demand. However bank runs did occur in the early years of the bank, and these runs were sometimes instigated by the Russians who were the British rival in Persia. The bank issued only small notes in the early years to be able to redeem the notes for silver even in the remote areas. With the protection of Persian soldiers, the bank supplied even remote branches with enough silver coins.

The bank's high level contact in Tehran was general Albert Houtum-Schindler who was, like Reuter, a British subject of German origin. Schindler lived in Persia for many years and was the most informed member of the European community in Persia at the time. Henry Drummond Wolff liked him so much that he tried unsuccessfully to persuade the foreign office to engage him as a member of Legation staff. Reuter employed him instead. Schindler and Rabino were instrumental in increasing the bank's reputation.

The bank was instrumental in providing British loans to the Shah between 1892 and 1911. These loans were secured using Caspian fisheries and the custom dues of the Persian Gulf ports and raised the alarm of Persian nationalists.
By 1928 the bank had 24 branches in all major Iranian cities.

Between 1928 and 1952, the Imperial Bank was subject to criticism and attack from the nationalistic Iranian governments. Bank Melli, an Iranian-controlled central bank, was established in 1928. In 1933, Imperial Bank was forced to relinquish its note-issuing powers. In the 1930s, exchange controls and barter agreements destroyed the Imperial Bank's business in financing foreign trade. Imperial Bank began to rapidly lose market share to Bank Melli, and by 1939 the Imperial Bank held just 9 percent of Iranian bank deposits. The bank sold off half of its branches in the 1930s.

In the late 1940s, the bank opened branches in the Persian Gulf States, and was the first bank in Kuwait, Dubai and Oman. In 1952 the bank abandoned the Iranian market and renamed itself the British Bank of the Middle East. In 1959 the British Bank of the Middle East was acquired by Hongkong Bank in a friendly takeover, and now forms part of its HSBC Bank Middle East subsidiary.

Assessment
According to Jones, "the Bank was widely seen as an agent of British imperialism, and with reason". Jones argues that during the two World Wars and in the early 1920s, the bank placed British diplomatic interests before those of Iran's elites.

See also

 Banking and Insurance in Iran
 Central Bank of Iran
 Ottoman Bank

References

External links
 Banknotes of the Imperial Bank of Persia

Banks of Iran
Iran–United Kingdom relations
Banks of the United Kingdom
Banks established in 1889
1889 establishments in Iran
British overseas banks
Former central banks